Schlesinger Group is a marketing research company specializing in qualitative and quantitative research data collection services, worldwide. It has 15 offices across key research markets in the United States and 10 in United Kingdom, Germany, France and Spain.

Overview

Schlesinger Group is a full service data collection company, specializing in research facilities and recruitment of interview and survey respondents (including cases of low-incidence and hard-to-reach populations). It supports studies in the consumer, healthcare, jury, finance,  IT and business markets. The company's services extend to both qualitative and quantitative research including methodologies such as focus groups, in-depth interviews, webcam focus groups/interviews, online communities, ethnographic studies, online surveys and hybrid solutions.

The company runs a series of proprietary panels of consumers, healthcare professionals, healthcare payers, patients and business people: InspiredOpinions (two panels under this name, one in USA and one in UK), OpinionsPartagées (France), Schmiedl Marktforschung (Germany) and BDI Research (Spain).

Schlesinger has a global network of proprietary facilities, panels and partnerships to provide worldwide data collection and project management services.

Schlesinger Group has been awarded the 2007 MRA Celebrated Company of the Year award. It has also been ranked Top Provider of Qualitative Research Services by MarketResearchCareers.com in their 2011 industry survey.

History

The company was founded in 1966 by Sarah Schlesinger. It was known as Schlesinger Associates from 1984, when her son Steve Schlesinger also joined the company. In 2000, Mike Sullivan joined the company as President and joint owner to oversee the development of new facilities and services across the US and in Europe.

In the years 1997-2008, Schlesinger Group underwent a national expansion, opening offices and facilities in the major American cities. In 2006, it acquired the British market research company The Research House, followed in 2010 by the simultaneous takeover of the French companies ConsuMed Research and Passerelles, and in 2011 of the German company Schmiedl Marktforschung.

In January 2018, Schlesinger announced a rebrand, which included a company name change to Schlesinger Group. In addition to a new trading name, the rebrand featured a new logo design and brand identity, a new website, and a flagship facility in Midtown Manhattan, NYC, opening in February 2018. In other adjustments, Schlesinger Interactive has rebranded to Schlesinger Quantitative to more clearly describe the online survey and in person-fieldwork services delivered. Schlesinger's European brand names (BDI Research, Schmiedl Maktforschung, The Research House, ConsuMed Research & Passerelles) remain unchanged, while they adopt the new brand identity.

In October 2015, Schlesinger Group acquired Chicago-based medical fieldwork company MedQuery. In June 2017, the company acquired Spain based BDI Research a full service fieldwork agency. The amounts were not disclosed in any merger.

Subsidiaries

The Research House Ltd (UK)
Passerelles, SARL (France)
ConsuMed Research, SAS (France)
Schmiedl Marktforschung GmbH (Germany)
Block de Ideas, S.L - BDI Research (Spain)

References

External links

Companies based in Middlesex County, New Jersey
International marketing research companies